Athrwys ap Meurig (c. 605–655) was a prince, and possibly king, of Gwent and Glywysing in Wales. He was the son of King Meurig ap Tewdrig and the father of the later king Morgan ab Athrwys. It is possible he died before his father Meurig and did not live to rule as king himself.

History
Athrwys's name is spelled variously. It is spelled Atroys in the 10th century Welsh Harleian genealogies and Athruis in the early medieval Latin Liber Landavensis. Some scholars believe that this name is etymologically related to that of the figure Andres[us] son of Morcant[us] who appears in the early medieval Latin Life of St Cadoc, concluding that both names derive from an early Old Welsh spelling *Antrēs.

He was the son of Meurig ap Tewdrig, a King of Gwent and Glywysing in South Wales. His mother was Onbrawst, daughter of Gwrgan Fawr, King of Ergyng. His siblings were Idnerth and Ffriog. His wife may have been Cenedlon ferch Briafael Frydig, though it has also been suggested that she was the wife of a later king of this dynasty; his children included Morgan ab Athrwys, later a king of Gwent, as well as Ithel and Gwaidnerth. While Athrwys's father Meurig and son Morgan are named as kings in the Book of Llandaff, Athrwys is only named as a king of Gwent in a charter which is believed to be spurious (on chronological grounds, due to the witnesses of the charter). Wendy Davies concluded that Athrwys predeceased his father and thus never ruled as king, and when Meurig died after a long reign the kingship passed to Morgan. Davies suggests Athrwys lived between about 605–655.

His son was Morgan ab Athrwys or Morgan Mwynfawr ('Morgan the Benefactor' in the Welsh language). Morgan was King of Morgannwg, or Gwent and Glywysing, land as far west as the River Towy and also encompassing land beyond the River Wye, into the old Kingdom of Ergyng, South Herefordshire.

Arthurian connection

Some writers have identified Athrwys ap Meurig as a potential historical basis for King Arthur. This identification is found at least as early as Thomas Carte's A General History of England, written in 1747. It was later put forward and popularised by William Owen Pughe in 1803. The theory subsequently gained more popularity during the 19th century.

Proponents of the identification of Athrwys ap Meurig with Arthur generally point to the fact that Athrwys was a prince (and possibly king) of Glywysing, Gwent and Ergyng, which is where King Arthur is placed in many sources. For example, Geoffrey of Monmouth describes Caerleon-upon-Usk as Arthur's main city, and the pre-Galfridian Life of St Cadoc also places Arthur in this region. Proponents of this theory argue that Athrwys lived in the sixth century, not the seventh century as is commonly believed by scholars. Thus, they argue that Athrwys lived at the same time as Arthur and in the same place as Arthur, indicating that they were, in reality, the same person. 

Critics of this theory point out that the Annales Cambriae reports the death of Ffernfael son of Ithael in 775. This is widely accepted as being Ffernfael ap Ithael ap Morgan ap Athrwys. If the great-grandson of Athrwys died in 775, that makes it virtually impossible for Athrwys to have lived in the sixth century; he must instead be a seventh-century individual (if the identification of the Ffernfael of the Annales Cambriae with his great-grandson is correct). This means that he would not have lived at the same time as Arthur. In addition, most scholars are in agreement that the name Athrwys comes from Archaic Old Welsh *Antrēs, not Arthur.

References

Sources

Davies, Wendy, The Llandaff Charters, National Library of Wales, 1979.
Sims-Williams, Patrick, "The Emergence of Old Welsh, Cornish and Breton Orthography, 600-800: the evidence of Archaic Old Welsh", Bulletin of the Board of Celtic Studies, V. 38, 1991, p. 52
Williams, David. (1796). The History of Monmouthshire.

7th-century births
7th-century deaths
7th-century Welsh people
Historical figures as candidates of King Arthur
Monarchs of Ergyng
Monarchs of Gwent
Welsh royalty